Fidelity, now defunct, was an organization within the Anglican Church of Canada committed to retaining traditional understanding of human sexuality within that church. It was opposed to, but in dialogue with, Integrity Canada.

See also

Anglican Essentials Canada

References

Anglican Church of Canada
Christian organizations based in Canada